Nyctosia poicilonotus is a moth of the subfamily Arctiinae. It was described by Harrison Gray Dyar Jr. in 1912. It is found in Mexico.

References

Lithosiini
Moths described in 1912
Moths of Central America